Jamkhandi State was one of the Maratha princely states of British India. It was founded in 1811 and its capital was at Jamakhandi. It was administered as part of the Deccan States Agency of the Bombay Presidency and was one of the former states of the Southern Maratha Country.

History
Jamkhandi state was founded in 1811 by Shrimant Gopalrao Patwardhan. He was a descendant of Bramhibhoot Harbhat Buva Patwardhan of Kurandvad Senior State.

The name of the state was derived from Jambukeshwar temple. The temple itself got the name because it was deep inside a  Jambul blueberry (Jambul in Marathi, Nerale Hannu in Kannada, Jamun in Hindi) forest. Today, a primary school functions from the temple precinct.

The town of Kundgol, which is in the neighboring Dharwar district, was a non-contiguous part of Jamkhandi State until it merged into the Indian Union on 19t February 1948.

Rulers
The rulers of the state bore the title 'Raja'. The Rajas of Jamkhandi belonged to the Patwardhan dynasty.

The rulers of Jamkhandi were of the Chitpavan Brahmin caste, originally from the Kotawada in Ratnagiri. Haribhat, who was the family priest of another Chitpavan Brahmin, the chief of Ichalkaranji. Three of Haribhat's sons served Peshwa and distinguished themselves during various conquests. The Peshwa awarded them Jagirs of Jamkhandi, Miraj, Sangli and Kurundwad, to honor their bravery and courage.

Jamkhandi was one of the Maratha Princely States of British India and was administered as part of the Bombay Presidency, later by the Deccan States Agency. Jamkhandi was founded by Gopalrao Ramchandrarao Patwardhan (1799–1840) in 1811. He was succeeded by Ramchandrarao Gopalrao Patwardhan (1833–1897), who was a very capable administrator, and moved his capital to Ramtirth, a hill near Jamkhandi, next to an old temple.

Rajas
 1811 – 18??  Ramchandra Rao Parashuram Rao
 18?? – 1840  Gopal Rao Ramchandra Rao
 18 November 1840 – 1897  Ramchandra Rao Gopal Rao  Appa Sahib Patwardhan
 1897 – 25 February 1924  Parashuram Rao Ramchandra Rao a.k.a. Bhav Sahib Patwardhan
 25 February 1924 – 15 August 1947  Shankar Rao Parashuram Rao a.k.a. Appa Sahib Patwardhan (b. 1906)

See also
 Maratha
 Maratha Empire
 List of Maratha dynasties and states
 Political integration of India

References

External links

Jamkhandi State जमखंडी संस्थान

Princely states of India
States and territories established in 1811
History of Karnataka
Dharwad district
1811 establishments in India
1948 disestablishments in India